Horace Wheaton (February 24, 1803 – June 23, 1882) was an American businessman and politician who served as a United States representative for New York's 24th congressional district from 1843 to 1847.

Early life and education 
Born in New Milford, Connecticut, he moved with his parents to Pompey, New York in 1810. He received limited schooling and graduated from Pompey Academy.

Career 
Wheaton engaged in mercantile pursuits and was a member of the New York State Assembly in 1834. He was one of the commissioners to build a railroad between Syracuse and Utica, and was postmaster of Pompey from 1840 to 1842. He was supervisor and city treasurer of Pompey and was elected as a Democrat to the Twenty-eighth and Twenty-ninth Congresses, holding office from March 4, 1843, to March 3, 1847. He was not a candidate for renomination in 1846 and that year moved to Syracuse. He was mayor of Syracuse from 1851 to 1853 and city treasurer in 1857 and 1858. He also engaged in hardware, saddlery, and mercantile pursuits.

Personal life 
Wheaton died in Syracuse in 1882. He was interned at the Oakwood Cemetery.

References

1803 births
1882 deaths
People from New Milford, Connecticut
New York (state) postmasters
City and town treasurers in the United States
Democratic Party members of the New York State Assembly
Mayors of Syracuse, New York
Democratic Party members of the United States House of Representatives from New York (state)
Burials at Oakwood Cemetery (Syracuse, New York)
19th-century American politicians